Slim Whitman Sings Million Record Hits is a studio album by Slim Whitman, released in 1960 on Imperial Records.

On this album, Whitman sings some of his biggest hits, which include "Rose Marie," "Indian Love Call," and "China Doll".

Release history 
The album was issued in the United States by Imperial Records as a 12-inch long-playing record, catalog numbers LP 9102 (mono) and LP 12102 (stereo).

In 1966, it was reissued in the United States under the title The Song of the Old Waterwheel.

There are also a 4-track-cartridge version (cat. nr. Imperial LP 9102) and a 8-track-cartridge version (cat. nr. Liberty 750), both titled Million Sellers.

Track listing

References 

1960 albums
Slim Whitman albums
Imperial Records albums